Around the World is a 1997 documentary film about Aqua directed by Peder Pedersen.

Summary
This film is a documentary about Aqua, accompanied by the music videos for "Roses Are Red", "Barbie Girl", "Doctor Jones", and "Lollipop".

Release
The film was released in Sweden and Denmark in 1997 and in Italy in 1998. The Swedish release included bonus postcards, a double poster and the promo CD single "Didn't I", while the Italian release included Italian subtitles.

Personnel
Lene Nystrom Rasted – female vocals
Rene Dif – male vocals
Soren Nystrom Rasted – keyboard, guitar
Claus Norreen – keyboard

External links
 Official website

Documentary films about pop music and musicians
1997 films
Aqua (band) video albums
1997 video albums
1990s English-language films